Trevor Brown (21 August 1933 – 3 November 2014) was a South African cricketer. He played two first-class matches for Border in 1952/53.

References

External links
 

1933 births
2014 deaths
South African cricketers
Border cricketers
Sportspeople from the Eastern Cape